John Alfred Beynon [sometimes mis-spelt Benyon] (died 26 June 1937) was a Welsh footballer who played for Doncaster Rovers and Aberdeen until his death from peritonitis on a club tour of South Africa in 1937.

Beynon signed for Aberdeen in February 1933 from Doncaster Rovers (having earlier played for other clubs in the Yorkshire and Lincolnshire region, namely Halifax Town, Scunthorpe United and Rotherham United) and established himself as the outside left in the Dons' first team, although he switched to the right wing at times, particularly following the arrival of Bill Strauss in 1936. A few weeks after playing in the 1937 Scottish Cup Final, he was struck down with appendicitis while on a tour of South Africa with Aberdeen and died of peritonitis. He was buried in South Africa.

References

Footballers from Cardiff
Welsh footballers
1937 deaths
Aberdeen F.C. players
Scunthorpe United F.C. players
West Bromwich Albion F.C. players
Halifax Town A.F.C. players
Rotherham United F.C. players
Doncaster Rovers F.C. players
English Football League players
Scottish Football League players
Year of birth unknown
Deaths from peritonitis
Association football outside forwards